Fautor vaubani is a species of sea snail, a marine gastropod mollusk, in the family Calliostomatidae within the superfamily Trochoidea, the top snails, turban snails and their allies.

Description
The length of the shell attains 7.6 mm.

Distribution
This marine species occurs off New Caledonia.

References

 Marshall, B.A., 1995. Calliostomatidae (Gastropoda: Trochoidea) from New Caledonia, the Loyalty Islands, and the northern Lord Howe Rise. Mémoires du Muséum national d'Histoire naturelle 167: 381-458

Calliostomatidae
Gastropods described in 1995